Amos Chalale Ketlele, is a South African actor and musician. He is best known for his role Gatanga' in the popular television serial Isidingo. He is also a renowned singer and a tap dancer.

Personal life
He was born and raised in Soweto. In 1987, he graduated from the Performing Arts Workshop as a dancer. Then he worked two years with the Free Flight Dance Company.

Career
In 1987, he had his first performance in a musical piece 'the great worlds'. He has acted in several theater plays such as West Side Story, The Merry Widow, Ipi Ntombi, Summer Holiday in 1998 and Soweto Story in 2007, and Tap Roots in 2010.

He has also appeared in numerous television series including Isidingo, Gaz'lam, Generations, Jacob's Crossing and Like Father Like Son. His role in the serial Isidingo became very popular.

Filmography
 Ashes to Ashes as Baba Nkomonde
 Ga Re Dumele as Guest Appearance 
 Gaz'lam as Kholifelo
 Isidingo as Gatanga
 Jacob's Cross as Andile's Spy 2
 Like Father Like Son as Zweli Nxasana
 Maseko Ties as Dr John Maseko
 Soul Buddyz as Guest Star
 Zero Tolerance as Themba Morogo

References

External links
 
 "I always tell people that change is instant

Living people
South African male television actors
1994 births
South African male film actors
People from Durban